Nikola Fraňková (born 7 February 1988) is a Czech former tennis player.

In her career, Fraňková won one singles title and 18 doubles titles on the ITF Women's Circuit. On 9 March 2009, she reached her best singles ranking of world No. 249. On 14 September 2009, she peaked at No. 157 in the doubles rankings.

Fraňková won four $25,000 doubles events in 2006, and in 2009 participated in three WTA Tour qualifying draws, at Warsaw, Portorož and Tashkent, losing in the first round in each.

Junior career
She and Ágnes Szávay were the runners-up to Victoria Azarenka and Marina Erakovic in the 2005 Australian Open girls' doubles. Fraňková won the girls' doubles at the 2005 US Open, with Russian Alisa Kleybanova.

ITF Circuit finals

Singles: 5 (1–4)

Doubles: 30 (18–12)

Junior career

Grand Slam finals

Girls' doubles

External links
 
 

1988 births
Living people
Sportspeople from Brno
Czech female tennis players
US Open (tennis) junior champions
Grand Slam (tennis) champions in girls' doubles
Universiade medalists in tennis
Universiade bronze medalists for the Czech Republic
21st-century Czech women